Ysgafell Wen North Top is a peak on a ridge in Snowdonia, North Wales. It lies to the north of the highest summit on the ridge Ysgafell Wen. It is a subsidiary summit of Allt-fawr. The summit is located at the edge of Cwm Edno, an edge that falls steeply into the cwm.

Small lakes surround the summit, known as Llynnau'r Cwn (the dog lakes). To the west lies the peak's top, known as Ysgafell Wen Far North Top.

References

External links
 www.geograph.co.uk : photos of Ysgafell Wen and surrounding area

Beddgelert
Dolwyddelan
Mountains and hills of Conwy County Borough
Mountains and hills of Gwynedd
Mountains and hills of Snowdonia
Hewitts of Wales
Nuttalls

cy:Ysgafell Wen